WKHK (95.3 FM) is a country music formatted broadcast radio station licensed to Colonial Heights, Virginia, serving Richmond and Petersburg in Virginia.  WKHK is owned and operated by SummitMedia.  The station's studios and offices are located west of Richmond proper in unincorporated Chesterfield County, and its transmitter is located in Bensley, Virginia.

WKHK is licensed by the FCC to broadcast in the HD digital hybrid format.

WKHK-HD2
On August 7, 2016, WKHK-HD2 and simulcasting translator W282CA signed on for the first time.  The new stations began stunting with Nuthin' but a 'G' Thang, by Dr. Dre and Snoop Dogg, on a loop.  The stunt ended just after Noon, on August 9, and the Classic Hip Hop format began.  Using Westwood One's Classic Hip Hop network, the first song heard on the station was Rock It by Master P.

On May 7, 2021, WKHK-HD2/W282CA dropped the classic hip hop format and began simulcasting WKHK.

On January 11, 2022, WKHK-HD2/W282CA dropped the WKHK simulcast and changed its format to classic country as "Classic Country 104.3".

WKHK-HD3
WKHK-HD3 carries a non-commercial Contemporary Christian music format branded as "The Journey," based at WRVL in Lynchburg which feeds translator W235AI at 94.9 FM.

References

External links
K95 Online

1972 establishments in Virginia
Country radio stations in the United States
Radio stations established in 1972
KHK